Louie Sakoda (born October 28, 1986) is an American former college and professional football player who was kicker and punter in the Canadian Football League (CFL) for two seasons.  He played college football for the University of Utah, and earned unanimous All-American honors.  Sakoda played professionally for the CFL's Saskatchewan Roughriders.

Early years
Sakoda was born in San Jose, California.  He attended Branham High School in San Jose, and played high school football for the Branham Bruins.

College career

Statistics
Field Goal Pct.: .864 (1st)
Field Goals Made: 57 (1st)
Field Goal Attempts: 66 (1st)
PAT Made: 137 (1st)
PAT Attempts: 140 (1st)
PAT Pct.: .979 (1st
Scoring (Overall): 308 (1st)
Scoring (Kick): 308 (1st)
Punts: 242 (1st)
Punt Yards: 10,188 (1st)
Punt Average: 42.1 (1st)
50-yard Punts: 50 (1st)

Awards and honors
2007 Rivals.com first-team All-American kicker
2007 SI.com second-team All-American punter
2007 CBS Sports first-team All-American punter and Football Writers Association of America
2008 unanimous first-team All-American kicker (received the honor after being named to the Associated Press, American Football Coaches Association, Football Writers Association of America, Sporting News, and the Walter Camp Football Foundation teams)

Professional career
Sakoda was signed as a free agent with the San Diego Chargers, but was released before the 2009 season. On October 14, 2009, he signed with the Saskatchewan Roughriders of the Canadian Football League.  Sakoda was released by the Roughriders on August 2, 2010 after struggling at the start of the season. Sakoda was signed by the Winnipeg Blue Bombers on August 10, 2010. He was injured before playing a single game and was released by the Bombers on September 22, 2010. He was later signed by the Edmonton Eskimos on March 21, 2011 after the team traded away Justin Medlock that same day. On June 26, 2011, Sakoda was released from the Eskimos.

References

External links
Utah bio

1986 births
Living people
All-American college football players
American players of Canadian football
Canadian football placekickers
Canadian football punters
Edmonton Elks players
Players of American football from San Jose, California
Players of Canadian football from San Jose, California
San Diego Chargers players
Saskatchewan Roughriders players
Utah Utes football players
Winnipeg Blue Bombers players
American sportspeople of Japanese descent
American football in Japan